Mitragyna ciliata is a species of flowering plant in the family Rubiaceae, native to west and west-central tropical Africa. It was first described in 1936.

References

 Naucleeae
Flora of West Tropical Africa
Flora of West-Central Tropical Africa
Plants described in 1936